Disney Interactive Studios, Inc. was an American video game developer and publisher owned by The Walt Disney Company through Disney Interactive. Prior to its closure in 2016, it developed and distributed multi-platform video games and interactive entertainment worldwide.

Most of the games released by Disney Interactive Studios were typically tie-in products to existing character franchises. On May 10, 2016, as a result of the discontinuation of its Disney Infinity series, Disney shut down Disney Interactive Studios, and exited the first-party home console game development business in order to focus on third-party development of home console video games through other developers such as Electronic Arts (Star Wars games), Warner Bros. Games (owned by rival company Warner Bros., which handles the publishing of Disney-related Lego video games and Cars 3: Driven to Win), Bandai Namco Entertainment (Disney Tsum Tsum Festival), Square Enix (Kingdom Hearts), and Capcom (several Disney games, Willow games and Marvel vs. Capcom). However, it continues to release games for iOS and Android devices under its own label, Disney Mobile.

History

1988–1994: Walt Disney Computer Software
Disney established its own in house gaming unit, Walt Disney Computer Software, Inc. (WDCS), and it was incorporated on September 15, 1988. WDCS generally used third-party development studios to design spin-off games using its existing portfolio of characters. WDCS had little success attributed by senior Disney executives due to low product quality and lack of understanding the differences between film and games.

The few market successes were third-party-published games based on major Disney animated features like Aladdin and The Lion King in 1993 and 1994 respectively. This led to a move from self-developed and self-published to funding and development management of games with third parties published the game.

1994–2002: Disney Interactive

Using the film studio style formula, WDCS was reorganized into Disney Interactive, Inc. (DI) on December 5, 1994 with the merging of WDCS and Walt Disney Television and Telecommunications. On April 15, 1997, Disney Interactive reduced its staff by 20%, effectively ending all in-house video game production. This increased the requests for licensing from third-party games companies. Under this plan, development and production cost risks were transferred to the game companies but reduced the per-unit revenue generated to Disney and effectively yielded a near 100 percent margin of licensed game sales. A thirteen-game agreement was made between Nintendo of America and Disney Interactive in 1999 for both the Nintendo 64 and Game Boy Color.

In May 2001, the company signed a deal with Sony Computer Entertainment to allow the latter to publish titles based on Atlantis: The Lost Empire, Monsters, Inc., Treasure Planet, Lilo and Stitch, and Peter Pan: Return to Never Land on the PlayStation and PlayStation 2.

In European territories, Infogrames formerly distributed several of Disney Interactive's PC titles, however, this agreement was later replaced with several separate distribution deals, including JoWooD Productions in Germany.

2003–2007: Buena Vista Games
Buena Vista Games, Inc. (BVG) was spun out of Disney Interactive in 2003 after a 2002 strategic review that chose to return to being a dedicated games publisher. With DI focused on children's games, BVG took on all other content game including mobile and online mediums. Buena Vista Games is probably best known for the Kingdom Hearts series along with Japanese developer Square Enix.

In April 2005, BVG purchased Avalanche Software in Salt Lake City, Utah and started a Vancouver, British Columbia based game development studio, Propaganda Games.

In September 2006, Buena Vista acquired Climax Racing. BVG formed a new game studio, Fall Line Studios, in November 2006 to create Disney and new game titles for the Nintendo DS and the Wii console.

2007–2014: Disney Interactive Studios
On February 8, 2007, The Walt Disney Company renamed Buena Vista Games to Disney Interactive Studios as part of a larger company initiative to phase out the Buena Vista brand that year. The studio publishes both Disney and non-Disney branded video games for all platforms worldwide, with titles that feature its consumer brands including Disney, ABC, ESPN, and Touchstone (which is used as a label for Disney). In July 2007, the studio acquired Junction Point Studios.

On June 5, 2008, Disney Interactive Studios and the Walt Disney Internet Group, merged into a single business unit now known as the Disney Interactive Media Group, and it merged its subsidiary Fall Line Studios with its sister studio, Avalanche Software, in January 2009. In February 2009, Disney Interactive acquired GameStar, a Chinese game development company. On September 8, 2009, Disney Interactive announced that it had acquired Wideload Games.

In November 2010, the executive Graham Hopper left the company. He announced his departure via an internal e-mail saying "the time has come for me to move on from the company and set my sights on new horizons."

DIS in October 2012 announced "Toy Box", a cross platform gaming initiative where Pixar and Disney characters will interact from a console game to multiple mobile and online applications. The first Toy Box cross platform game is Disney Infinity based on the Toy Story 3 game's Toy Box mode crossed with a toy line.

After the purchase of Lucasfilm by The Walt Disney Company in 2012, Disney Interactive assumed the role of developing Star Wars games for the casual gaming market, while Electronic Arts would develop Star Wars games for the core gaming market through an exclusive license (although LucasArts did retain the ability to license Star Wars games to other developers for the casual gaming market).

At E3 2013, Disney and Square Enix released a teaser trailer for Kingdom Hearts III, after going seven years of not declaring any console Kingdom Hearts game since Kingdom Hearts II. The game would release nearly six years later in January 2019.

Disney Interactive Studios has lost more than $200 million per year from 2008–2012 during a period in which it shut down Propaganda Games, Black Rock Studio and Junction Point Studios and its co-president John Pleasants stepped down in November 2013 after the launch of Disney Infinity.

2014–2016: Decline and dissolution
On March 6, 2014, 700 employees were laid off. After the cancellation of Disney Infinity, Disney Interactive Studios closed in 2016.

List of games

The company also publishes games from Q Entertainment worldwide except Asia: Lumines II, the sequel to the puzzle game for the PSP system; Lumines Plus, a new version of Lumines for the PlayStation 2; Every Extend Extra, a puzzle shooter; and a Disney Interactive Studios's Meteos: Disney Edition, the popular Meteos game for the Nintendo DS with Disney characters.

The company revealed a lineup of games at E3 2006, which include DIE's Turok, a re-imagining of the video game series of the same name and Desperate Housewives: The Game, based on the hit television show.

Disney Interactive Studios is credited in all entries to the Kingdom Hearts franchise, with the original release box art of each entry to the series having different logos and name of the company seeing as coincidentally, the company is re-branded in between the releases. Notably however, the company is not credited to actually developing the game.

Studios

Moved to Disney Interactive 
Disney Mobile
Disney Online
Playdom (later defunct)
 Acclaim Games

Former/defunct
Avalanche Software, based in Salt Lake City, Utah. Acquired April 2005. Shut down May 2016. Later re-opened and sold to Warner Bros. Interactive Entertainment in January 2017.
Black Rock Studio, acquired as Climax Racing in September 2006 and closed in July 2011.
Creature Feep, 2009–2015.
Fall Line Studios, 2006–2009, merged into Avalanche Software.
Junction Point Studios, based in Austin, Texas. Acquired July 2007. Shut down in January 2013.
Propaganda Games, 2005–2011.
Wideload Games, based in Chicago, Illinois. Acquired September 8, 2009. Shut down March 6, 2014.
Rocket Pack, 2010–2015.
Gamestar, based in China. Acquired February 2009, defunct.

References

1988 establishments in California
2016 disestablishments in California
Companies based in Glendale, California
Defunct companies based in Greater Los Angeles
Defunct software companies of the United States
Defunct video game companies of the United States
Disney Interactive
Disney video games
Software companies based in California
Software companies disestablished in 2016
Software companies established in 1988
Technology companies based in Greater Los Angeles
Video game companies based in California
Video game companies disestablished in 2016
Video game companies established in 1988
Video game development companies
Video game publishers